Diuris aurea, commonly known as the golden donkey orchid, is a species of orchid which is endemic to Australia, growing in New South Wales and Queensland. It has one or two leaves at the base and two to five golden-yellow to orange flowers with some darker markings.

Description

There are between 2 and 5 golden yellow to orange flowers with some darker markings on the labellum and dorsal sepal. The petals are erect and spread, ear-like above the flower. Flowering occurs from August to November.

Taxonomy and naming
Diuris aurea was first formally described in 1804 by James Edward Smith and the description was published in his book Exotic Botany (Volume 1). The specific epithet (aurea) is derived from the Latin word aurum meaning "gold".

Distribution and habitat
In New South Wales, golden donkey orchid grows between Marulan and the Hunter Valley, growing in grassy places in forest in areas near the coast. It also occurs in Queensland where its conservation status is "of least concern".

References

Orchids of New South Wales
Endemic orchids of Australia
aurea
Plants described in 1804